Alfred Borda (born 14 December 1913, date of death unknown) was a Maltese sailor. He competed in the Finn event at the 1960 Summer Olympics.

References

External links
 

1913 births
Year of death missing
Maltese male sailors (sport)
Olympic sailors of Malta
Sailors at the 1960 Summer Olympics – Finn
Place of birth missing